{{DISPLAYTITLE:C20H30O2}}
The molecular formula C20H30O2 (molar mass : 302.45 g/mol, exact mass : 302.22458) may refer to:

 Abietic acid, a resin acid
 BNN-20, a steroid
 Bosseopentaenoic acid, a conjugated polyunsaturated fatty acid
 Dimethandrolone, an anabolic steroid
 Eicosapentaenoic acid, an omega-3 fatty acid
 Isopimaric acid, a resin acid
 Levopimaric acid, a resin acid
 Metenolone, an anabolic steroid
 Methyl-1-testosterone, an anabolic steroid
 Methyltestosterone, an anabolic steroid
 18-Methyltestosterone, an anabolic steroid
 Metogest, a steroidal antiandrogen
 Mibolerone, an anabolic steroid
 Norethandrolone, an anabolic steroid
 Oxendolone, a steroidal antiandrogen
 Oxogestone
 Pimaric acid, a resin acid
 Stenbolone, an anabolic steroid